WWQA (90.7 FM) is a Christian radio station broadcasting a Southern gospel format as an affiliate of The Life FM. Licensed to Albany, Georgia, United States, the station serves the Albany area. The station is currently owned by The Power Foundation.

History
The station went on the air as WGNP on November 30, 1987. On December 31, 2002, the station changed its call sign to WWXC, on March 4, 2008, to WWVO, and on October 30, 2014, to the current WWQA.

References

External links

WQA
Radio stations established in 1987
1987 establishments in Georgia (U.S. state)
Southern Gospel radio stations in the United States
WQA